Acona Church, Cemetery, and School is a historic complex near Lexington, Mississippi, in the community of Acona. This combination of church, school and cemetery was once common in rural areas, but the Acona complex is one of the few surviving ones.

The church was built as a Methodist church in 1876 as a two-story building. The upper story was used for a lodge hall. A three-room separate building on one edge of the property served as the school. A cemetery was also developed here, with gravestones from the 1880s, and it was still in use in the early 21st century. The complex was listed on the National Register of Historic Places in 2002.

References

External links
 
 

Former churches in Mississippi
Defunct schools in Mississippi
Greek Revival church buildings in Mississippi
Churches completed in 1874
19th-century churches in the United States
School buildings on the National Register of Historic Places in Mississippi
Churches on the National Register of Historic Places in Mississippi
Cemeteries on the National Register of Historic Places in Mississippi
1874 establishments in Mississippi
National Register of Historic Places in Holmes County, Mississippi